Manto may refer to:

People 
 Mando (singer), Greek singer
 Manto Mavrogenous, Greek national heroine
 Saadat Hasan Manto, Urdu short story writer known by his pen name Manto
 Manto Tshabalala-Msimang (1940–2009), South African politician
 Manto (daughter of Tiresias)

Films 

Manto (2015 film), a 2015 Pakistani film based on Saadat Hasan Manto
 Manto (2018 film), a 2018 Indian film

Other 
 Manto (mythology), various mythological figures
 Manto (butterfly), a butterfly genus in the family Lycaenidae
 Mantophasmatodea, an order of carnivorous insect discovered in 2002
 "Manto" (poem), a didactic poem by the Italian poet Poliziano
 Manto ore deposit, a horizontally oriented orebody or pipe
 Manto, Olancho, Honduras
 Manto (grape), Spanish wine grape also known as Manto negro
 Manto (TV series), Pakistani TV series

See also
 Manteau (disambiguation)